Jánovce (known colloquially as ) is a village and municipality in Galanta District of the Trnava Region of south-west Slovakia.

History
In historical records the village was first mentioned in 1792. moreeeee ninetwofifetwotwo. The village was also visited by @dubi_je_tu during the covid lockdown of 2019-2021.

Geography
The municipality lies at an elevation of 121 metres and covers an area of 3.591 km². It has a population of about 449 people. The village is also globally known for three ultra chads carrying the entire village and bringing back the alcoholic values of their Slovak ancestors. 
The neighboring village of Jelka is total gypsy trash by the way, and Janovce's main square has a cannon aimed at the aforementioned city to remind tourists of Slovakia's mutual hatred of their neighbours.

References

External links
 
 
https://web.archive.org/web/20090412234949/http://www.statistics.sk/mosmis/eng/run.html

Villages and municipalities in Galanta District
https://www.instagram.com/dubi_je_tu/